"Are U Ready?" is a dance song recorded by French DJ Pakito. It was the third and last single from his debut album Video, after the previous two European hits "Living on Video" and "Moving on Stereo", and was released on March 2007 in Finland, and two months later in the other countries. "Are U Ready?" was a top ten hit in Poland, Finland and France (where it reached its highest position #2), but achieved a moderate success in Belgium.

The music, which uses a sample from Groove Coverage's 2000 song, "Are U Ready", was remixed by Julien Ranouil (as for Pakito's previous single), Xavier Longuepée and David Toinet, and the single was published by Universal Music. The words "Are U Ready" are the only lyrics of "Are U Ready?", repeated throughout the song by a female voice.

Formats and track listings

 CD single
 "Are U Ready?" (Radio Edit) (3:27)
 "Are U Ready?" (Remix) (6:03)
 "Are U Ready?" (Short Edit) (3:34)
 "Are U Ready?" (Krafft Short Mix) (3:10)
 "Are U Ready?" (Krafft Mix) (6:53)

 CD maxi (April 25, 2007)
 "Are U Ready?" (Radio Edit) (3:27)
 "Are U Ready?" (Short Mix) (3:34)
 "Are U Ready?" (Krafft Short Mix) (3:10)
 "Are U Ready?" (Remix) (6:03)
 "Are U Ready?" (Krafft Mix) (6:53)
 "Are U Ready?" (Extended) (6:01)
 "Are U Ready?" (Swindlers Mix) (5:50)

 Digital download
 "Are U Ready?" (Radio Edit) (3:27)

Charts

References

French songs
Pakito songs
2007 singles
2006 songs